Minuscule 400 (in the Gregory-Aland numbering), δ 50 (Soden), is a Greek minuscule manuscript of the New Testament, on parchment. Palaeographically it has been assigned to the 12th century.

Description 

The codex contains the text of the Gospel of Matthew 12:29-13:2, Acts of the Apostles, Catholic epistles, and Pauline epistles on 249 parchment leaves with some lacunae (Matthew 1:1-23:27). The text is written in one column per page, in 14-15 lines per page.

It contains the Euthalian Apparatus.

 Lacunae
Acts, 1:11-2:11; Romans 1:1-27; 1 Corinthians 14:12-15:46; 2 Corinthians 1:1-8; 5:4-19; 1 Timothy 4:1-Hebrews 1:9.

 Text
Kurt Aland did not place the Greek text of the codex in any Category.

History 

The manuscript was damaged by fire and water. 
It once belonged to Henry Benzil, Archbishop of Uppsala († 1758), then to Laurence Benzelstierna, Bishop of Arosen. It was described by C. Aurivill (1802), collated by G. T. Pappelbaum (1815). The manuscript was added to the list of New Testament manuscripts by Scholz (1794–1852).
C. R. Gregory saw it in 1887.

The manuscript is currently housed at the Vatican Library (Chis. R IV 6 (gr. 6) in Rome.

See also 

 List of New Testament minuscules
 Biblical manuscript
 Textual criticism

References

Further reading 

 

Greek New Testament minuscules
12th-century biblical manuscripts